Idionyx corona is a species of dragonfly in the family Synthemistidae. It is known only from the Western Ghats of India.

Description
It is a small dragonfly with emerald-green eyes. Its thorax is metallic green with a golden reflex. There is a vestigial
humeral yellow stripe, laterally a narrow oblique yellow stripe traversing the spiracle and another stripe on the lower border of metepimeron. Wings are transparent, tinted with pale golden-yellow at base. Abdoemen is black. Segments 2 and 3 are narrowly
yellow along the ventral border. Segment 10 prominently keeled. Anal appendages are black.

The species is a small one and varies from others by the male, as well as by the female, having the wings tinted with golden-yellow along the costa nearly to the pterostigma. The inferior appendage without lateral spines will serve to distinguish
it from others of the same group, whilst the female is easily distinguished by the shape of its unique vesicle.

See also
 List of odonates of India
 List of odonata of Kerala

References

Synthemistidae
Taxa named by Frederic Charles Fraser